Saleh Foroutannik (born 1994 in Mashhad) is an Iranian professional basketball player. He currently plays for Petrochimi Bandar Imam in the Iranian Super League as well as for the Iranian national basketball team, as a Power forward and Center. He is 6'8" in height.

2012 FIBA Asia Cup
Foroutan invited to Iran national team attending the fourth FIBA Asia Cup (2012), when he was just 17 years old. Iran finally won the tournament and Foroutan enjoyed playing aside Iranian big stars like Nikkhah Bahrami, Afagh and Sahakian. "Even practicing with senior players has been a great experience." Foroutan said.

References 

1994 births
Living people
Centers (basketball)
Iranian men's basketball players
Petrochimi Bandar Imam BC players
Power forwards (basketball)
Sportspeople from Mashhad
20th-century Iranian people
21st-century Iranian people